Liliana Patricia Yambrún (born 13 October 1957) is an Argentine politician, currently serving as National Deputy representing Buenos Aires Province. A member of the Justicialist Party, Yambrún was elected in 2019 for the Frente de Todos. She previously worked in the municipal government of La Matanza Partido, as private secretary during the mayorship of Verónica Magario.

Born in Buenos Aires, Yambrún is divorced and has two children. She ran for a seat in the La Matanza City Council in the 2017 elections as part of the Unidad Ciudadana coalition. She ran for a seat in the Argentine Chamber of Deputies in the 2019 legislative election; she was the 10th candidate in the Frente de Todos list in Buenos Aires Province. The list received 51.64% of the vote, enough for Yambrún to be elected.

As a national deputy, Yambrún formed part of the parliamentary commissions on Foreign Affairs and Worship, Mercosur, Freedom of Expression, Families and Childhood, Communications, and Municipal Affairs. She was a supporter of the 2020 Voluntary Interruption of Pregnancy bill, which legalized abortion in Argentina.

Electoral history

References

External links
Profile on the official website of the Chamber of Deputies (in Spanish)

Living people
1957 births
Politicians from Buenos Aires
Buenos Aires Province politicians
Members of the Argentine Chamber of Deputies elected in Buenos Aires Province
Women members of the Argentine Chamber of Deputies
Justicialist Party politicians
21st-century Argentine politicians
21st-century Argentine women politicians